The Hatheam dam is a dam in the Asir region of Saudi Arabia that opened in 1984. The main purpose of the dam is flood control.

See also 

 List of dams in Saudi Arabia

References 

Dams in Saudi Arabia